The 5th (Princess Charlotte of Wales's) Dragoon Guards was a British army cavalry regiment, officially formed in January 1686 as Shrewsbury's Regiment of Horse. Following a number of name changes, it became the 5th (Princess Charlotte of Wales's) Regiment of Dragoon Guards in 1804. 

In 1922, it was amalgamated with The Inniskillings (6th Dragoons) to form the 5th/6th Dragoons. Its history and traditions continue today in the Royal Dragoon Guards, an armoured cavalry unit of the British Army.

History

On 1 January 1686, several independent troops of horse raised in response to the 1685 Monmouth Rebellion were formed into the Earl of Shrewsbury's Regiment of Horse. After the 1688 Glorious Revolution, it served in the Williamite War in Ireland, including the Battle of the Boyne and the First Siege of Limerick. When the Nine Years' War ended in 1697, the regiment escaped disbandment by being made part of the Irish military establishment, where it remained until the creation of the United Kingdom in 1801.

During the War of the Spanish Succession, the unit was commanded by William Cadogan, close aide to the Duke of Marlborough. It was engaged in many of Marlborough's battles and sieges, including Blenheim, Ramillies and Malplaquet; after the Peace of Utrecht in 1713, it resumed garrison duties in Ireland, where it spent most of the next 80 years.

Renamed Second Irish Horse in 1746, it then became 5th Regiment of Dragoon Guards in 1788. On the outbreak of the French Revolutionary Wars in 1793, it was posted to Flanders where it fought at the April 1794 Battle of Beaumont. The unit returned to Ireland and helped suppress the 1798 Irish Rebellion, including the battles of Arklow, Vinegar Hill and Ballinamuck. In 1804, it was retitled 5th (Princess Charlotte of Wales's) Regiment of Dragoon Guards after Princess Charlotte, later simplified to 5th (Princess Charlotte of Wales's) Dragoon Guards. 

Posted to Spain in 1810, it was part of Le Marchant's brigade during the Peninsular campaign. The Battle of Salamanca in July 1812 is considered one of Wellington's greatest victories and Le Marchant's attack as the 'single most destructive charge made by a brigade of cavalry in the whole Napoleonic period.' The regiment celebrated 'Salamanca Day' until its dissolution in 1922; the tradition continues among several units of the modern British army.

Redesignated heavy cavalry, it was sent to the Crimean War in 1853 and fought in the October 1854 Battle of Balaclava. The Charge of the Heavy Brigade was a famous action but casualties were relatively light; the Brigade as a whole lost 92 dead and wounded in total, 15 of whom came from the 5th Dragoon Guards.  A small detachment joined the 1885 Nile Expedition in 1885 but its next serious action was during the 1899–1902 Second Boer War, when it fought at the battles of Elandslaagte and Ladysmith. 

During the First World War, it formed part of the British Expeditionary Force that landed in France in August 1914. Retitled 5th Dragoon Guards (Princess Charlotte of Wales's) in 1921, the following year it was amalgamated with the Inniskillings (6th Dragoons), to form 5th/6th Dragoons.

Regimental museum

The regimental collection is held in the Cheshire Military Museum at Chester Castle.

List of Colonels
The colonels of the regiment were as follows:

1686 Named after Colonel eg Shrewsbury's Horse
1686: Earl of Shrewsbury; resigned in 1687 and joined William III in the Dutch Republic;
1687: Marmaduke Langdale, 2nd Baron Langdale; 
1687: Richard Hamilton; Irish Catholic, removed from command and jailed in the Tower of London 31 December 1688;
1688: John Coy; Lieutenant-Colonel of the regiment since 1686, experienced veteran with service in France and the Tangier Garrison;
1697: Charles Butler, 1st Earl of Arran;
1703: William Cadogan, later Earl Cadogan; Marlborough's quartermaster-general and head of intelligence, succeeded him as Master-General of the Ordnance in 1722. 
1712: George Kellum; in service with the regiment since its formation in 1686;
1717: Robert Napier 
1740: Clement Neville 
1744: Field Marshall Viscount Cobham;
1745: Thomas Wentworth (died November 1747);

1746 2nd Irish Horse
1747: Thomas Bligh
1758: John Waldegrave, 3rd Earl Waldegrave
1760: Hon. John Fitzwilliam

1788 5th Regiment of Dragoon Guards
1789: John Douglas
1790: Thomas Bland; previously served 36 years with the 7th Dragoon Guards;

1804  5th (the Princess Charlotte of Wales's) Regiment of Dragoon Guards
1816: Prince Léopold Georg Christian Friedrich of Saxe-Saalfeld-Coburg

1823 5th (Princess Charlotte of Wales's) Dragoon Guards
1831: Gen. Sir John Slade; died aged 97 in 1859 and served in the Peninsular War, where contemporaries described him as 'that damned stupid fellow.' 
1859: Lt-Gen. James Brudenell, 7th Earl of Cardigan; commanded the Light Brigade in the Crimean War;
1860: Gen. Hon. Sir James Scarlett; acted as CO of the regiment from 1840, led the Charge of the Heavy Brigade at Balaclava;
1871: Gen. Richard Parker;
1885: Gen. Sir Thomas Westropp McMahon
1892: Lt-Gen. Somerset Gough-Calthorpe, 7th Baron Calthorpe
1912: Maj-Gen. Richard Temple Godman
1912: Maj-Gen. William Edward Marsland
1920: Lt-Gen. Sir George Tom Molesworth Bridges
1922: Regiment amalgamated with The Inniskillings (6th Dragoons) to form the 5th/6th Dragoons

See also
British cavalry during the First World War
5th (or Royal Irish) Regiment of Dragoons (1756–1799)

Notes

References

Sources
 
 
 
 

Cavalry regiments of the British Army
Dragoon Guards
1685 establishments in England
Military units and formations disestablished in 1922
Military units and formations established in 1685
DG5
Regiments of the British Army in the Crimean War
Princess Charlotte of Wales (1796–1817)